Tommy Crook is an American guitarist who lives in Tulsa, Oklahoma.  He was inducted into the Oklahoma Music Hall of Fame in 2007.

Professional career
Crook played fingerstyle. He replaced the lower two strings on his Gibson switchmaster with bass strings, allowing him to create the impression of playing bass and guitar simultaneously.

Crook has played with many artists including J.J. Cale, Chet Atkins, Merle Haggard and Leon Russell.

Personal information
Crook was born in Tulsa, Oklahoma, on February 16, 1944.  He began playing guitar at the age of four and by the age ten had started appearing on local television in Tulsa. He became the father of Kaycie Crook on September 4, 1975. He became the grandfather of Ashleigh Brazell on January 28, 1997.

Discography
Mr. Guitar and Mr. Drums, 1968.
Tommy Crook, 1989.
World of Fingerstyle Jazz Guitar, Release Date: September 29, 2003, Format: DVD-Video.
110° In The Shade—Guitar Duets with Anthony Weller, 2002

References

Tommy Crook & Anthony Weller
110° In The Shade
Guitar Duets
2002
Ton Tom Records

The liner notes to this CD state that Tommy recorded some 75 solo tunes but these have never been published.

Living people
1944 births
Guitarists from Oklahoma
20th-century American guitarists